Walter Zevallos (born 15 April 1973) is a Peruvian retired footballer.

References

1973 births
Living people
Peruvian footballers
Association football midfielders
Association football defenders
Peru international footballers
Club Alianza Lima footballers
FBC Melgar footballers